The monodomain model is a reduction of the bidomain model of the electrical propagation in myocardial tissue.
The reduction comes from assuming that the intra- and extracellular domains have equal anisotropy ratios.
Although not as physiologically accurate as the bidomain model, it is still adequate in some cases, and has reduced complexity.

Formulation
Being  the domain boundary of the model, the monodomain model can be formulated as follows

Derivation 
The monodomain model can be easily derived from the bidomain model. This last one can be written as

Assuming equal anisotropy ratios, i.e. , the second equation can be written as

Then, inserting this into the first bidomain equation gives the unique equation of the monodomain model

Boundary conditions 
Differently from the bidomain model, usually the monodomain model is equipped with an isoltad boundary condition, which means that it is assumed that there is not current that can flow from or to the domain (usually the heart). Mathematically, this is done imposing a zero transmembrane potential flux, i.e.:

See also
Bidomain model
Forward problem of electrocardiology

References

Cardiac electrophysiology
Differential equations
Electrophysiology
Partial differential equations
Biological theorems